Daniel Eduardo Benítez Pernía (23 September 1987 – 9 April 2021) was a Venezuelan professional footballer. A defender, he played for seven club sides and made one appearance for the Venezuela national team.

Club career 
With Deportivo La Guaira he won the Copa Venezuela in 2014 and 2015. His final match was for Zamora in 2020.

International career 
Benítez's only international appearance was against Costa Rica in 2016.

Death 
Benítez was diagnosed with cancer in March 2020 and died of cancer on 9 April 2021.

Honours
 Copa Venezuela: 2014, 2015

References

1987 births
2021 deaths
Venezuelan footballers
Association football defenders
Venezuela international footballers
Estudiantes de Caracas players
Deportivo Táchira F.C. players
A.C.C.D. Mineros de Guayana players
Deportivo La Guaira players
Real Esppor Club players
Minervén S.C. players
Zamora FC players
Deaths from cancer in Venezuela
People from San Cristóbal, Táchira